is a village located in Gunma Prefecture, Japan. , the village had an estimated population of 4,314 in 1694 households, and a population density of 11 persons per km².
m².  Much of the village is within the borders of Oze National Park.

Geography
Located in northern Gunma, Katashina is bordered by Tochigi Prefecture to the east and Fukushima Prefecture to the northeast. The village is very mountainous, with the highest elevation being 2578 m and the lowest 640 m. The temperature can reach up to 36 °C in the summer, but in the winter, it can drop to -18 °C. The average temperature is 11 °C, the yearly precipitation is 1042 mm, and amount of snowfall is 95 cm, with the snowy period lasting for 120 days.

 Mountains: Mount Nikkō-Shirane (2578 m), Mount Shibutsu (2228 m), Mount Hotaka (2158m)
 Rivers: Katashina River, Ōtaki River
 Lakes: Marunuma (Maru Swamp), Suganuma

Surrounding municipalities
Gunma Prefecture
 Numata
 Minakami
Kawaba
Tochigi Prefecture
 Nikkō
Fukushima Prefecture
 Hinoemata
Niigata Prefecture
 Uonuma

Climate
Katashina has a humid continental climate (Köppen Dfb) characterized by warm summers and cold winters with heavy snowfall.

Demographics
Per Japanese census data, the population of Katashina has decreased by more than half over the past 60 years.

History
The area of present-day Katashina was part of the tenryō holdings within Kōzuke Province administered directly by the Tokugawa shogunate during the Edo period. On April 1, 1889 with the creation of the modern municipalities system after the Meiji Restoration, Katashina village was established within Tone District, Gunma.

Government
Katashina has a mayor-council form of government with a directly elected mayor and a unicameral village council of ten members. Katashina, together with the other municipalities in Tone District, contributes one member to the Gunma Prefectural Assembly. In terms of national politics, the town is part of Gunma 1st district of the lower house of the Diet of Japan.

Economy
The economy of Katashina is heavily dependent on seasonal tourism to ski resorts and to onsen hot springs.

Education
Katashina has one public elementary school and one public middle school operated by the town government. The town does not have a high school.

Transportation

Railways
Katashina does not have any passenger railway service.

Highways

Local attractions
 Katashina Hot Springs
 Hanasaku Hot Springs
 Oze Tokura Hot Springs
 Marunuma Hot Springs
 Shirane Hot Springs
 Ozegahara - Oze National Park
 Marunuma Dam
 Sonohara Dam
 Konsei Mountain Pass
 Chigira Farm
 Marunuma Plateau Ski Resort
 Katashina Plateau Ski Resort
 Oze Iwakura Ski Area
 Oze Tokura Ski Area
 Hotaka Bokujo Ski Area
 Oguna Hotaka Ski Area
 Ca et la Ski Resort Oze

References

External links

Official Website 

Villages in Gunma Prefecture
Katashina, Gunma